Eka (autonym: o21 kha24; exonym: Menghua) is a Loloish language of Yunnan, China. There are 3,000 speakers in Yijiacun, Heliu, Shuangjiang County, Lincang Prefecture. Eka speakers claim to have migrated from Weishan County about 300 years ago.

References

Bibliography 
Yang, Cathryn. 2010. Lalo regional varieties: Phylogeny, dialectometry, and sociolinguistics. Melbourne: La Trobe University PhD dissertation. http://arrow.latrobe.edu.au:8080/vital/access/HandleResolver/1959.9/153015.

Loloish languages